Degerbøl's blind snake (Siagonodon borrichianus) is a species of snake in the family Leptotyphlopidae. The species is native to southern South America.

Etymology
The specific name, borrichianus, is in honor of Danish scientist Ole Borch.

Geographic range
S. borrichianus is found in western Argentina.

Habitat
The preferred natural habitat of S. borrichianus is shrubland.

Diet
S. borrichianus preys upon the larvae of ants and termites.

Reproduction
S. borrichianus is oviparous.

References

Further reading
Adalsteinsson SA, Branch WR, Trape S, Vitt LJ, Hedges SB (2009). "Molecular phylogeny, classification, and biogeography of snakes of the family Leptotyphlopidae (Reptilia, Squamata)". Zootaxa 2244: 1-50. (Siagonodon borrichianus, new combination).
Degerbøl, Magnus (1923). "Description of a new Snake of the Genus Glauconia, from Mendoza". Videnskabelige Meddelelser fra Dansk naturhistorisk Forening i Københaven 76: 113–114. (Glauconia borrichiana, new species).
Freiberg MA (1982). Snakes of South America. Hong Kong: T.F.H. Publications. 189 pp. . (Leptotyphlops borrichianus, p. 117).

External Links
 iNaturalist page

Siagonodon
Reptiles of Argentina
Reptiles described in 1923